The Iroquois Museum is an educational institution dedicated to fostering understanding of Iroquois culture using Iroquois art as a window to that culture. The Museum is a venue for promoting Iroquois art and artists, and a meeting place for all peoples to celebrate Iroquois culture and diversity. As an anthropological institution, it is informed by research on archaeology, history, and the common creative spirit of modern artists and craftspeople.

The Iroquois Museum opened in 1981 in the historic homeland of the Mohawk Indians, one of the original Five Nations of the Iroquois Confederacy.

About
The Iroquois Museum, which opened in its Howes Cave location in 1992, is built in the form of a traditional longhouse, important to Iroquois culture. These were used by extended families for their residences. Some longhouses were reserved for tribal councils and  community meetings or ceremonies. Once based in New York, most members of the Iroquois tribes now live on First Nations reserves in Quebec and Ontario, Canada; others live in New York, Wisconsin and Oklahoma.

The museum was built at a cost of $1.3 million. It holds the largest collection of Iroquois art in the United States, and is designed to teach and interpret the culture of the Six Tribes of the Iroquois.

Also located in the museum is the Iroquois Performing Arts Amphitheater, used for music and dance works based on traditional practices related to the Iroquois culture. Ancestors were in their territory for 10,000 years. The museum's exhibits also embrace modern culture, such as one in 2008 that featured Native American baseball players.

Partners
The Iroquois Museum has partnered with a number of other museums throughout the United States including:

Mashantucket Pequot Museum
Mystic Aquarium
Institute for American Indian Studies
Heritage Museum & Gardens

Old Sturbridge Village
Shinnecock Museum
Eiteljorg Museum of American Indians & Western Art

References

External links
Iroquois Indian Museum, Official website
Camp Henderson, nearby Boy Scout facility

1981 establishments in New York (state)
Art museums and galleries in New York (state)
History museums in New York (state)
Iroquois culture
Museums in Schoharie County, New York
Native American museums in New York (state)